Coffee High School may refer to:

 Coffee High School (Georgia), United States
 Coffee High School (Alabama), United States